Francesca Mifsud (born July 19, 1996) is a Maltese beauty pageant titleholder who won Miss Universe Malta 2018 on July 13, 2018. She represented Malta at Miss Universe 2018 pageant.

Personal life
Mifsud lives in Zejtun, Malta. She is a law student at University of Malta and would like to pursue a career in criminal and civil law. In August 2016, Mifsud entered for the first time the Miss Universe Malta pageant where she finished in the Top 5 and awarded Miss Photo Model. In October of the same year, she won the contest Best Model of the World and represented Malta in Istanbul, Turkey where she won Best Face of the World. On July 13, 2018 Francesca represented her local council, Zejtun, and competed against 24 other contestants in a direct transmission on TVM. She won Miss Universe Malta and was awarded Best Physique.

Achievements
Miss Universe Malta 2018
Miss Universe Malta 2018 Best Physique
Best Model of the World 2016 Best Face
Best Model of the World Malta 2016
Best Model of the World Malta Miss Photogenic
Miss Universe Malta 2016 3rd Runner Up
Miss Universe 2016 Best Photo Model
Represented Malta three times with the National Basketball team

References

External links
missuniversemalta
missuniverse.com

Living people
1996 births
Miss Universe 2018 contestants
People from Żejtun
Maltese beauty pageant winners